Phone Chatter (1991–2007) was an American Thoroughbred Champion racehorse who won the 1993 Breeders' Cup Juvenile Fillies and who was voted American Champion Two-Year-Old Filly. She was bred and raced by Seattle, Washington businessman, Herman Sarkowsky and trained by Richard Mandella.

Phone Chatter sold for $3.6 million while in foal to Dixie Union at the November 2001 Keeneland Sales to Ireland's renowned owner of Coolmore Stud, John Magnier.

References

 Phone Chatter's pedigree and partial racing stats

1991 racehorse births
2007 racehorse deaths
Racehorses bred in Kentucky
Racehorses trained in the United States
Eclipse Award winners
Breeders' Cup Juvenile Fillies winners
Thoroughbred family 3-o